Monoptilon bellidiforme is a species of flowering plant in the family Asteraceae known by the common names daisy desertstar and small desert star. It is native to the desert southwest of the United States, where it grows in typical desert habitat such as sandy flats and washes. It is similar to the other Monoptilon, M. bellioides, but it is usually smaller. Its stem is just a few centimeters long, sometimes small enough so that the inflorescence sits at ground level. The leaves are no more than a centimeter long. The flower head has many ray florets which are usually white, sometimes purple-tinged. They are 5 to 7 millimeters long. The fruit is an achene about half a centimeter long including the pappus, which is an elongated bristle surrounded by fused scales.

External links
 Calflora Database: Monoptilon bellidiforme (Small desert star)
 Jepson eFlora (TJM2) treatment of Monoptilon bellidiforme
USDA Plants Profile for Monoptilon bellidiforme (small desert star)
Flora of North America
UC CalPhotos gallery of Monoptilon bellidiforme

Astereae
North American desert flora
Flora of the California desert regions
Flora of the Southwestern United States
Natural history of the Mojave Desert
Taxa named by Asa Gray
Flora without expected TNC conservation status